The 1898 California Golden Bears football team was an American football team that represented the University of California, Berkeley during the 1898 college football season. The team competed as an independent under head coach Garrett Cochran and compiled a record of 8–0–2. The season's victory in that year's Big Game was its first win against Stanford.

Schedule

References

California
California Golden Bears football seasons
College football undefeated seasons
California Golden Bears football